Alison Maguire is a camogie player for Dublin and UCD with whom she won an Ashbourne Cup medal in 2008 and an Ashbourne All Star award in 2010. She is a member of the St Vincent's club. She won an All-Ireland Féile na nGael medal in 2003 and has two senior Dublin championship honours (2005 and 2007) and four senior league medals. Maguire was named Dublin Junior player of the year in 2006. With a total of 0-18 she was the eighth highest scoring player in the Senior Championship of 2011.

References

External links

 Official Camogie website
 Dublin Camogie website
 Review of 2009 championship in On The Ball official Camogie magazine
 https://web.archive.org/web/20091228032101/http://www.rte.ie/sport/gaa/championship/gaa_fixtures_camogie_oduffycup.html Fixtures and results] for the 2009 O'Duffy Cup
 All-Ireland Senior Camogie Championship: Roll of Honour
 Video highlights of 2009 championship Part One and part two
 Video of Dublin’s 2009 championship match against Tipperary
 Video of 2009 Dublin senior semi-final Good Counsel 1-07 Ballyboden 0-8
 Video of 2009 Dublin senior semi-final Naomh Mearnog 3-7 St Vincent’s 0-13

Year of birth missing (living people)
Living people
Dublin camogie players
UCD camogie players